Jerry William Byers (March 29, 1952 – December 25, 2006) was a Canadian professional ice hockey forward.

Career
Byers was drafted in the first round, twelfth overall, by the Minnesota North Stars in the 1972 NHL Amateur Draft. He played forty-five games in the National Hockey League: twenty-four with the North Stars in the 1972–73 and 1973–74 seasons, fourteen with the Atlanta Flames in the 1974–75 season, and seven with the New York Rangers in the 1977–78 season. He left North America in 1980 to join HC Salzburg in the Austrian Hockey League. He then spent two seasons in Switzerland's National League B for EHC Grindelwald before finishing his career in the Japan Ice Hockey League for Jūjō Ice Hockey Club.

As a youth, he played in the 1963 and 1964 Quebec International Pee-Wee Hockey Tournaments with his Kentville minor ice hockey team.

Career statistics

Regular season and playoffs

References

External links

1952 births
2006 deaths
Atlanta Flames players
Canadian ice hockey forwards
Cleveland Barons (1937–1973) players
Ice hockey people from Nova Scotia
Jacksonville Barons players
Kitchener Rangers players
Minnesota North Stars draft picks
Minnesota North Stars players
National Hockey League first-round draft picks
New Haven Nighthawks players
New York Rangers players
Nippon Paper Cranes players
Nova Scotia Voyageurs players
Omaha Knights (CHL) players
People from Kentville, Nova Scotia
Providence Reds players
EC Red Bull Salzburg players